Geaca is a commune in Cluj County, Transylvania, Romania. It is composed of six villages: Chiriș (Kőristanya), Geaca, Lacu (Feketelak), Legii (Légen), Puini (Kispulyon) and Sucutard (Vasasszentgothárd).

Demographics 
According to the census from 2002 there was a total population of 1,744 people living in this town. Of this population, 81.07% are ethnic Romanians, 17.31% are ethnic Hungarians and 1.43% ethnic Romani.

References 

Communes in Cluj County
Localities in Transylvania